Manjhand  is a small village in the district of Jamshoro. The population of the village is estimated to be between 800 and 900. The population contains a heavy part of the Lanjar, Khosa, khaskheli, Panhwar, Mir Bahar (Mallah), and Baladi tribes. It is situated beside the Unarpur railway station and is two kilometers from the right bank of Indus River. The village also has a rich schooling system. The Department of Education and Literacy - Sindh has established primary schools for girls and boys in Manjhand.

The complete postal address of Manjhand is "Post Office and village Manjhand, near railway station Unarpur, Taluka Kotri, District Jamshoro."Village had been electrified in the year 1989, water supply has been commissioned in 2016. Small dispensary under PPHI is functional. A link road connecting the village with the Indus Highway was provided in 2014.

Notable residents
Seth Harchandrai Vishandas, politician & lawyer, born in Manjhu

References 

Manjhu are the tribe related with Magsi as brother in Balochistan and Manjhu Have their Own District Called Manjhu Shori and also a Large margen of this Tribe Live in Balochistan Nari Bakshoo Jadeed Village Ghulam Murtaza Shahnawaz Manjhu Village near Landhi Balochistan

External links 
 OCHA map, A surveyed map of a region of Sindh by U.N.O.C.H.A.(The United Nations Office for the Coordination of Humanitarian Affairs) in which Manhju is visible near Matiari town.

Populated places in Jamshoro District
Villages in Sindh